The table lists some of the movies produced in Technicolor Process 4 between 1932 and 1955. Most were filmed using three-strip Technicolor cameras though a few had sequences, or even their entirely, filmed using other techniques. These included:

Successive Frame (SF) Camera (or Successive Exposure Camera)

The first full-color animations were photographed using three-strip cameras. From 1934, animations were filmed using modified black and white cameras taking successive exposures through three color filters on a single panchromatic film, being simpler to operate and far less expensive. The technique lasted until 1973 (Robin Hood, Disney).

Kodachrome and Technicolor Monopack

These were the same positive cine stock marketed as 'Kodachrome Commercial' in 16mm and, by an agreement between Eastman Kodak and Technicolor, as ‘Technicolor Monopack’ in 35mm. When all in lowercase, 'monopack' is a generic term. When using a leading capital letter, 'Monopack' is a trade-mark of Technicolor. 

Technichrome

Technichrome was a bipack system developed by Technicolor Ltd in England to photograph the 1948 Olympic Games because there were only four three-strip cameras in the UK at that time. Technichrome used 20 modified black and white cameras, Newall BNCs, built by Newall Engineering based on the Mitchell Camera which the Mitchell Camera Company had failed to patent in the UK.

All films listed were release printed from three (including those in bipack Technichrome) color matrices in Technicolor's dye-transfer process in either Hollywood or England. Matrices were exchanged between the plants for release prints in their respective markets. Technicolor plants were opened in France and Italy in 1955, the French laboratory closing in 1958.

Technicolor Process 5 described movies filmed using Eastmancolor monopack negative film, with negative processing and dye-transfer printing by Technicolor; these films were usually credited Color by Technicolor. Technicolor also dye-transfer printed Eastmancolor and Ansco negative movies where the negative had been processed by another laboratory with the credit Print by Technicolor. Technicolor publicity dated 1954 added the facility to produce dye transfer release prints from Agfacolor, Gevacolor and Ferraniacolor color negative stock, popular in Europe. No movies originating on color negative film are intentionally listed here.

The first movie using Process 4 and the three-strip camera was the 1932 animated short Flowers and Trees, whereas the first live-action feature was Becky Sharp, released in 1935.

Cinematographers listed in italics are associate photographers, usually employed by Technicolor. Cinematographers in bold are Academy Award Winners for that year.

Notes

References

 The Digital Bits list from wayback machine archive
 Unofficial reference list of three-strip technicolor films from wayback machine archive
 Timeline of Historical Film Colors

Film-related lists
Lists of films by technology